The Kalōpā Native Forest State Park and Recreation Area is a state park with an arboretum of native trees located approximately  northwest of Hilo, near the village of Honokaa, a few miles inland from the Mamalahoa Highway (Route 19) section of the Hawaii Belt Road, Island of Hawaii, Hawaii.

This  park adjoins an additional  in the Kalopa Forest Reserve. A number of rare plants can be found in the arboretum area, including endangered loulu palms (Pritchardia spp.), as well as a number of rare native hibiscus. Due to the altitude, damp and chilly weather is the norm.

Services available at the park include restrooms, drinking water, cabins, and camping.

External links
 Hawaii State Parks page for Kalopa State Recreation Area

See also 
 List of botanical gardens in the United States

Protected areas of Hawaii (island)
Arboreta in Hawaii
Botanical gardens in Hawaii
State parks of Hawaii